Jegathesan Manikavasagam (born 2 November 1943), is often referred to as the Flying Doctor of Malaysia for his athletic achievements in Asia, despite being firstly a medical student then a doctor. He was an icon in the 1960s, regarded as the "Golden Era" of Malaysian athletics. In his hey day, he was regarded as the fastest man in Asia.  He served the government health service for 32 years including the posts of Director of the Institute for Medical Research and Deputy Director-General of the Ministry of Health, Malaysia

Jegathesan is a Medical Researcher; and was appointed Chairman of the  Commonwealth Games Federation (CGF) Medical Commission and honorary Medical Advisor for the 2006 Melbourne Commonwealth Games. He served as Chairman of the Medical Council, and the Anti-Doping Commission of the Olympic council of Asia. He also served as the Deputy President of the Olympic Council of Malaysia (OCM).

Sports Involvement

Asian Games
In 1966, he earned the accolade of being the fastest man in Asia by winning three gold medals at the Bangkok Asian Games in the 100 m, 200 m and 4 × 100 m Men's Relay events.

Commonwealth Games
At the Kingston Commonwealth Games in 1966, Dr Jega became the first Malaysian to qualify for the final of the 220-yard (now the 200 m) race.

Dr Jegathesan was not only an accomplished athlete, doctor and researcher, but held important responsibilities as Chairman of the Commonwealth Games Federation (CGF) Medical Commission and honorary Medical Advisor for the 2006 Melbourne Commonwealth Games.

In an interview with the New Straits Times, Dr Jega said it was a great honour, to serve his country.

"But in whatever capacity, being part of the Commonwealth Games in itself keeps the adrenaline pumping as it brings back fond memories," he said.

Olympic Games
Dr Jega has competed in three consecutive Olympic Games, namely Rome (1960), Tokyo (1964) and Mexico (1968).

He qualified  for two 200m semi-finals and the national record he set in 1968 (20.92s) stood for 49 years until it was broken in 2017.

Honours

Honours of Malaysia
  : Member of the Order of the Defender of the Realm (A.M.N.) (1966)
  : Officer of the Order of the Defender of the Realm (K.M.N.) (1979)
  : Companion of the Order of Loyalty to the Crown of Malaysia (J.S.M.) (1991)
  : Commander of the Order of Meritorious Service (P.J.N.) (1998)
  : Commander of the Order of Loyalty to the Crown of Malaysia (P.S.M.) (2010)

References

External links
 
Sports Reference

1943 births
Living people
People from Kuala Kangsar
Malaysian male sprinters
Olympic athletes of Malaya
Olympic athletes of Malaysia
Athletes (track and field) at the 1960 Summer Olympics
Athletes (track and field) at the 1964 Summer Olympics
Athletes (track and field) at the 1968 Summer Olympics
Asian Games gold medalists for Malaysia
Asian Games silver medalists for Malaysia
Asian Games bronze medalists for Malaysia
Medalists at the 1962 Asian Games
Medalists at the 1966 Asian Games
Asian Games medalists in athletics (track and field)
Athletes (track and field) at the 1962 Asian Games
Athletes (track and field) at the 1966 Asian Games
Commonwealth Games competitors for Malaysia
Athletes (track and field) at the 1966 British Empire and Commonwealth Games
Malaysian medical doctors
Malaysian people of Tamil descent
Malaysian people of Indian descent
Members of the Order of the Defender of the Realm
Officers of the Order of the Defender of the Realm
Companions of the Order of Loyalty to the Crown of Malaysia
Commanders of the Order of Meritorious Service
Commanders of the Order of Loyalty to the Crown of Malaysia
Southeast Asian Games medalists in athletics
Southeast Asian Games gold medalists for Malaysia